Events from the year 1443 in France

Incumbents
 Monarch – Charles VII

Events
 August - John Beaufort, 1st Duke of Somerset lands with 8,000 strong English force at Cherbourg-en-Cotentin during the Hundred Years War
 Unknown - The Hospices de Beaune is founded

Births
 1 December - Magdalena of France, princess (died 1495)

Deaths
 28 January - Robert le Maçon, royal advisor (born 1365)

References

1440s in France